Les McCann Ltd. in San Francisco is a live album by pianist Les McCann recorded in 1960 and released on the Pacific Jazz label.

Reception

Allmusic gives the album 4 stars.

Track listing 
All compositions by Les McCann except as indicated
 "Oh, Them Golden Gaters" - 3:54
 "Red Sails in the Sunset" (Hugh Williams, Jimmy Kennedy) - 8:19
 "Big Jim" - 6:57
 "I Am in Love" (Cole Porter) - 4:45
 "Jeepers Creepers" (Harry Warren, Johnny Mercer) - 6:06
 "Gone On and Get That Church" - 6:03
 "We'll See Yaw'll After While, Ya Heah" - 1:15

Personnel 
Les McCann - piano
Herbie Lewis - bass
Ron Jefferson - drums
Reice Hamel - recording engineer

References 

Les McCann live albums
1961 live albums
Pacific Jazz Records live albums